Gaston Corbiere (11 July 1900 – 24 December 1968) was a French racing cyclist. He rode in the 1927 Tour de France.

References

1900 births
1968 deaths
French male cyclists
Place of birth missing